Chromosome 17p13.1 deletion syndrome is a protein in humans that is encoded by the DEL17P13.1 gene.

References 

Human proteins